Rim 1994, also known as Rim only, is the ninth studio album from Serbian and former Yugoslav rock band YU Grupa.

The album was entitled Rim 1994 (Rim being Serbian for Rome), as it was recorded in Rome at the end of 1994. Rim 1994 is the first album recorded with the guitarist Petar Jelić, who replaced Bata Kostić. There would be a 10-year gap between Rim 1994 and YU Grupa's next studio album, 2005's Dugo znamo se.

Track listing
"Odlazim" (D. Jelić, B. Telatović) – 4:20
"Oluja" (D. Jelić, I. Ristić) – 4:24
"Dunave" (D. Jelić, Z. Stanković, V. Andrevski) – 4:18
"Gledaj samo pravo" (D. Jelić, Z. Stanković) – 4:25
"Ruža vetrova" (D. Jelić, Z. Stanković) - 4:14
"Duša peva" (P. Jelić, Z. Stanković, I. Ristić) – 4:58
"Blok" (D. Jelić, I Ristić, P. Jelić) – 3:26
"Hoće, neće" (D. Jelić, I Ristić) – 3:54
"Rock 'n' Roll" (D. Jelić, I Ristić, P. Jelić) – 4:08
"Reka" (D. Jelić, Z. Stanković, P. Jelić) – 4:28
"Buđenje" (P. Jelić) – 4:42

Personnel
Dragi Jelić - guitar, vocals
Žika Jelić - bass guitar
Petar Jelić - guitar
Ratislav Đelmaš - drums

Guest musicians
Mario Zannini Quirini - keyboards

References 
 EX YU ROCK enciklopedija 1960-2006,  Janjatović Petar;  

YU Grupa albums
1995 albums
PGP-RTS albums